Abbasia Begum Mecci (1922–1970) was a member of the legislative council of the Indian state of Mysore (now Karnataka) during the 1960s.  She is one of the very few Muslim women of her days to have achieved that status. She took M.Sc. Degree from Central College in 1961.

Personal life 
Abbasia Begum Mecci married M. S. Mecci and the couple has one son and two daughters.

Positions held 

 worked as Superintendent, Government Vigilance Shelter, Bangalore, for a year.
 Elected to the Legislative Council during April 1960.

References

1970 deaths
Members of the Karnataka Legislative Council
20th-century Indian women politicians
20th-century Indian politicians
1922 births
Indian National Congress politicians from Karnataka
Women members of the Karnataka Legislative Assembly